This is a list of achievements in major international table tennis events according to gold, silver and bronze medal results obtained by athletes representing different nations. The objective is not to create a combined medal table; the focus is on listing the best positions achieved by athletes in major global events, ranking the countries according to the most podiums accomplished by athletes of these nations. In order to be considered for the making of the list, competitions must be ranked among the highest possible rank (R1) by the International Table Tennis Federation (ITTF); these competitions are: 1) Summer Olympic Games, 2) Youth Olympic Games, 3) World Table Tennis Championships, 4) ITTF World Youth Championships, and 5) Table Tennis World Cup. Masters, as well as Para meets, such as the Para World Championships and the Paralympic Games, were not taken into consideration, as per ITTF guidelines.

Results
The conventions used on this table follow the ITTF guidelines, namely: MS for men's singles, WS for women's singles, MD for men's doubles, WD for women's doubles, XD for mixed doubles, MT for men's team and WT for women's team. The Mixed Team event at the Youth Olympic Games is referred to as XT.

Notes
 A red background  indicates that the result was achieved in doubles or mixed team events where each athlete represented a different country. These results are considered valid for both countries and accounted for in the final ranking.
The table is pre-sorted by total number of medal results. In case of a tie, countries are then compared according to most gold medal results, silver medal results and bronze medal results, respectively. Persisting a tie, equal ranks are given, with countries being listed in alphabetical order.

1 The medal was officially awarded under the Olympic flag at the 2010 Summer Youth Olympics to a Mixed-NOCs team consisting of one athlete from China and one athlete from Tunisia.

Further reading 
 Table tennis at the Summer Olympics
 World Table Tennis Championships
 List of World Table Tennis Championships medalists
 Table Tennis World Cup
 Table tennis at the Youth Olympic Games
 ITTF World Youth Championships
 List of World Junior Table Tennis Championships medalists

See also 
Major tournaments for disabled athletes
 Table tennis at the Summer Paralympics
 World Para Table Tennis Championships

Other major world tournaments
 List of ITTF World Tour Grand Finals medalists
 Table tennis at the Summer Universiade

Continental tournaments
 Asian Table Tennis Championships
 Table tennis at the Asian Games
 European Table Tennis Championships
 Table tennis at the 2015 European Games
 Table tennis at the Pan American Games

Achievements in sports
 List of major achievements in sports by nation

References 

Table tennis
Table tennis
Table tennis competitions
Table tennis at multi-sport events
Table tennis-related lists